Neal Mallett (born 30 September 1957) is a British fencer. He competed at the 1980 and 1984 Summer Olympics.

References

1957 births
Living people
British male fencers
Olympic fencers of Great Britain
Fencers at the 1980 Summer Olympics
Fencers at the 1984 Summer Olympics
Fencers from Berlin